Clara Lee (born Lee Sung-min on 14 January 1985), better known by her mononym Clara, is a Swiss-born British actress and model based in South Korea.

Career 
Clara (born Lee Sung-Min，李成敏) made her entertainment debut under her birth name in 2005 and starred in her first film in 2009, Five Senses of Eros. In January 2012, she adopted Clara as her stage name, which was announced at a press conference for the drama series, Take Care of Us, Captain. Reasons given for the name change included that her birth name, Sung-min, was "male-sounding" and that her English name had always been Clara.

In May 2013, Clara became an overnight sensation online after throwing a ceremonial first pitch in a professional baseball game dressed in form-fitting leggings. She has since been hailed as an up-and-coming star and a sex symbol. In September 2013, Clara drew criticism from South Korean netizens for apparently contradicting herself on television by saying she liked to eat chicken and drink beer in one program and stating the contrary in another. Consequently, she closed down her Twitter and Facebook accounts. Afterwards, she again played supporting roles in the television series Goddess of Marriage (2013) and Emergency Couple (2014), followed by a leading role in the sex comedy film Casa Amor: Exclusive for Ladies (2015).

In December 2014, she filed a lawsuit against her agency Polaris Entertainment to nullify her contract on the grounds of being sexually harassed by its president Lee Kyu-tae; Polaris denied those allegations and countered that Clara had been blackmailing the agency to end her contract which is due to expire in 2018. In July 2015, prosecutors cleared Clara of the blackmail allegations and indicted Lee for making threats against her that implied physical violence.

On 18 September 2015 Clara dropped her suit against Polaris Entertainment, bringing their legal battle to an end.

Personal life 
Clara is the daughter of singer Lee Seung-kyu, a former member of the bilingual band, Koreana.

In January 2019, she announced her marriage to a Korean-American businessman.

Controversy 
The actress admitted “having lied several times in an attempt to cover up past lies.” She had appeared on Korea’s version of Saturday Night Live and was reprimanded by the host of the show, top comedian Shin Dong-yup.  She apologized by saying “I’m sorry, I’m sorry” to the host of her past dishonesty.

Filmography

Film

Television series

Variety show

Music video

Awards and nominations

References

External links 
 
 
 
 
 

1985 births
British female models
British film actresses
British television actresses
British voice actresses
British people of South Korean descent
El Camino College alumni
Living people
People from Bern
South Korean female models
South Korean film actresses
South Korean television actresses
South Korean voice actresses
British expatriates in South Korea